Allan Nørregaard (born 19 March 1981 in Kolding) is a Danish sailor. Together with Peter Lang, he won bronze at the 2012 Summer Olympics in the 49er class.

References

Danish male sailors (sport)
1981 births
Living people
Olympic sailors of Denmark
Sailors at the 2012 Summer Olympics – 49er
Olympic bronze medalists for Denmark
Olympic medalists in sailing
Medalists at the 2012 Summer Olympics
Sailors at the 2016 Summer Olympics – Nacra 17
People from Kolding
Sportspeople from the Region of Southern Denmark